Tony Richardson (1928–1991) was a British film director.

Tony Richardson may also refer to:
Tony Richardson (American football) (born 1971), former American football fullback
Tony Richardson (British Army officer) (1922–2015)
Tony Richardson (Australian footballer) (1925–1999), Australian rules footballer
Tony Rickardsson (born 1970), Swedish motorcycle racer
Tony Richardson (footballer, born 1932), English footballer
Tony Richardson (footballer, born 1943), English footballer

See also
Antonio Richardson (born 1992), American football offensive lineman
Anthony Richardson (disambiguation)